Noé Jouin (born 2 August 1998) is a French field hockey player.

Career

Club level
In club competition, Jouin plays for Saint Germain in the French National League.

Les Bleus
Jouin made his debut for Les Bleus in 2021 during a test match against Belgium in Antwerp. Later that year he was also named in the French squad for the season three of the FIH Pro League.

Junior national team
Noé Jouin made his debut for the French U–21 team in 2021 at the FIH Junior World Cup in Bhubaneswar. At the tournament he won a bronze medal.

References

External links

2002 births
Living people
French male field hockey players
Male field hockey forwards
Place of birth missing (living people)
2023 Men's FIH Hockey World Cup players